"Good Days" is a song by American singer SZA. It was released through Top Dawg Entertainment and RCA on December 25, 2020, as the lead single from her second studio album, SOS (2022). SZA wrote the song alongside Jacob Collier, who provides background vocals, and with producers Carter Lang, Los Hendrix, and Nascent. "Good Days" is an alternative R&B and alternative pop song. 

"Good Days" was a commercial success and peaked at number nine on the Billboard Hot 100, becoming SZA's first solo top ten hit and third overall on the chart. Outside the United States, it also reached the top ten in Australia, Belgium, Ireland, Malaysia, New Zealand, and Singapore, and peaked at number seven on the Billboard Global 200. The song was met with critical acclaim and was nominated for Best R&B Song at the 64th Annual Grammy Awards.

Background and release
SZA first teased the song on July 15, 2020, via her Instagram stories. "Good Days" was originally featured at the tail end of the music video for "Hit Different", released in September 2020, leading to speculation among listeners that it would serve as a B-side to that single. On October 21, 2020, SZA explained that the song was "in clearance" for release. A week before release, she confirmed the track to come out before 2021. The song was eventually released as a surprise drop on Christmas Day 2020. Upon release, the singer revealed that she started writing the song during a session on Carter Lang's birthday and "finished it randomly recently".

Composition
Dubbed a "nostalgic track", "Good Days" sees SZA singing about "former love, soul searching, and rejoicing carefreely" over "guitar-tinged riff plays", while she makes use of her "dreamy vocals". Compared to its predecessor, the song "manages to hit much more of a melodic, narrative-driven tone that puts it more in line with her CTRL output".

The accending tone inserted at the end of the song is an easter egg of Jacob Collier's song "In Too Deep".

Chart performance
In the United States, "Good Days" entered the Billboard Hot 100 at number 38 as the week's highest debut. The song rose to number 23 the following week. The song later reached a new peak at number 9 on the Hot 100, making it SZA's first top ten single as a solo artist, second top 10 as a lead artist following "All the Stars", and third in total including "What Lovers Do" with Maroon 5. The song also reached a peak of number three on the Hot R&B/Hip-Hop Songs chart and number seven on the Global 200, her highest peak on either chart to date.

Accolades

Music videos 
Two music videos were released for "Good Days". Both videos were directed by SZA.

Official fan video 
On January 13, 2021, SZA tweeted a request for fans to submit videos of their "happiest, saddest, [and] YOUR UGLIEST moments" to an email address, with a deadline of Saturday at midnight. The fan video was released on February 10, 2021, and featured a compilation of videos submitted by fans lip-syncing to the song as well as featuring the aforementioned moments intercut with behind-the-scenes footage of the official video.

Music video 
On March 5, 2021, the official music video was released. The video takes place with SZA experiencing a mushroom-induced psychedelic experience. It features scenes of SZA dancing while buried waist up in an oversized Alice in Wonderland-inspired garden and pole-dancing in a library. Jacob Collier cameos in the video as the man within the green television. In a similar fashion to the video for "Hit Different", the video ends with a teaser of "Shirt" and features SZA pole-dancing at an empty gas station while bathed in pink lighting.

Credits and personnel
Credits adapted from Tidal.

 Solána Rowe – vocals, songwriting, composition
 Jacob Collier – vocals, songwriting, composition
 Carlos Muñoz – songwriting, composition
 Carter Lang – songwriting, composition, production
 Christopher Ruelas – songwriting, composition
 Loshendrix – production
 Nascent – production
 Shawn Everett – mixer
 Joe Visciano - additional mixing
 Rob Bisel – recording engineering, vocal production

Charts

Weekly charts

Year-end charts

Certifications

Release history

References

2020 singles
2020 songs
SZA songs
Jacob Collier songs
RCA Records singles
Songs written by Jacob Collier
Songs written by SZA
Top Dawg Entertainment singles